Bir Kasd Ali District is a district of Bordj Bou Arréridj Province, Algeria.

Municipalities
The district is further divided into 3 municipalities:
Bir Kasdali
Khelil 
Sidi Embarek

Districts of Bordj Bou Arréridj Province